WWVT (1260 kHz) and WWVT-FM (89.9 MHz) are non-commercial public radio stations.  WWVT is licensed to Christiansburg, Virginia, and WWVT-FM is licensed to Ferrum, Virginia.  They broadcast a classical music format and are owned and operated by Virginia Polytechnic Institute and State University.  WWVT-FM is the flagship station of WVTF Music, a companion service to WVTF, Southwestern Virginia's NPR member news and information station.   WWVT-AM-FM have their studios and offices at WVTF's facility in Roanoke.

WWVT-FM has an effective radiated power (ERP) of 1,100 watts.  The transmitter is on Waidsboro Road in Ferrum.  WWVT 1260 has a power of 5,000 watts by day and 25 watts at night.  Its transmitter is on Walton Road at Caboose Road in Radford.  Programming is also heard on a series of rebroadcasters and FM translators around Southwest Virginia.

Programming
WWVT-AM-FM are the flagship stations of WVTF Music. Much of the network's weekday programming is classical music, from midnight to early evenings.  Weeknights are devoted to jazz music.

Weekends include blocks of album adult alternative (AAA), bluegrass, Americana and opera. National and regional shows include Metropolitan Opera radio broadcasts, Sunday Baroque, Mountain Stage, The Thistle and Shamrock, All Songs Considered, Pipedreams and American Routes.

History

WWVT-FM 89.9
The original call sign was WFFC, the student station of Ferrum College. Its power at the time was only 100 watts.

In 2003, the Virginia Tech Foundation launched a secondary all-news and talk service, Radio IQ, on WWVT (1260 AM in Christiansburg). This schedule contrasted with WVTF's full-service schedule of music and news. As WWVT was only licensed to broadcast during the day at the time, WFFC joined Radio IQ in order to give it a 24-hour signal. The Virginia Tech Foundation also intended to have WFFC feed Radio IQ to extra FM translators that it owned. Since FCC rules prevent a station from feeding translators via microwave that are not co-owned, Ferrum sold WFFC to the foundation in November of that year.

This arrangement lasted until July 10, 2017, when Radio IQ became the Virginia Tech Foundation's primary service and moved to WVTF's more powerful signal and repeater network. As WVTF covers WFFC's entire broadcast area, it dropped Radio IQ to become the flagship of WVTF Music. The station changed its call sign to the current WWVT-FM in the same month. Due to the relatively modest coverage areas of the WWVT stations and their translators, WVTF Music is simulcast on the second HD Radio channels of all full-power Radio IQ stations except WRIQ in Richmond.

WWVT 1260 AM

AM 1260 signed on in October 1954.  Its original call sign was WBCR and it was a daytimer, required to leave the air at night.  It was later known as "Triple J" WJJJ.  It competed in the 1960s and 1970s with Virginia Tech's student radio station, WUVT, for the local Top 40 market.

The station became WNNI in 1995. Bocephus Broadcasting purchased eight stations in the Blacksburg-Christiansburg market in 1997, after which it donated WNNI to the Virginia Tech Foundation.

In 2003, Virginia Tech launched the original incarnation of Radio IQ on the rechristened WWVT. WWVT was originally a daytimer that was required to go off the air at sunset to prevent interference to WCHV and WKXR on the same channel. After more than 50 years of daytime-only operation, WWVT added 25 watts of night power in 2005.

WWVT left Radio IQ and joined the WVTF Music network in 2017, in order to take advantage of its Blacksburg-based FM translator W238BN (95.5 FM).

Network stations

Full-powered stations

Notes:

Low-powered translators

References

External links
WWVT-FM Online

1989 establishments in Virginia
Public radio stations in the United States
NPR member stations
Radio stations established in 1989
WVT-FM